Matsumurella is a genus of flowering plants in the family Lamiaceae, first described in 1915. It is native to China and Japan. The genus is closely related to Galeobdolon, and the species below are discussed under that name in Flora of  China.

Species
 Matsumurella chinensis (Benth.) Bendiksby - Anhui, Fujian, Guangdong, Guangxi, Hunan, Jiangsu, Jiangxi, Taiwan, Zhejiang
 Matsumurella kwangtungensis (C.Y.Wu) Bendiksby - Guangdong
 Matsumurella szechuanensis (C.Y.Wu) Bendiksby - Chongqing
 Matsumurella tuberifera (Makino) Makino - Japan, Ryukyu Islands, Taiwan, Guangxi, Hunan, Jiangxi
 Matsumurella yangsoensis (Y.Z.Sun) Bendiksby - Guangxi

References

Lamiaceae
Lamiaceae genera